Yitzhak Isaac Levy ((); May 15, 1919, Manisa, Turkey – July 21, 1977, Jerusalem) was an Israeli singer-songwriter, musicologist and composer in Judeo-Spanish. He also worked as director of a radio program and was an author of various works on musicology.

Biography
Isaac Levy was born in Manisa, near Izmir, to a Sephardic Jewish family and moved with his parents to then British Mandate of Palestine (1922, now Israel) at the age of three. He studied the Conservatory of Music in Jerusalem (now the Jerusalem Academy of Music and Dance), and in Tel Aviv at the Samuel Rubin Israel Academy of Music where he developed his baritone. Isaac Levy composed music for Biblical verses and hymns written by poets of the golden age of Jewish culture in Spain, such as Judah Halevi, Ibn Gabirol, Abraham Ibn Ezra, and others.

In 1954 he founded for the Israeli public radio, Kol Yisrael ('Voice of Israel'), a series of broadcasts in the Ladino language. With his wife, Kohava Levy (born in 1946), Isaac Levy had a daughter, Yasmin Levy who continues his musical tradition. Kohava Levy is also a singer of Sephardic songs and is a skilled interpreter of Sephardic music. In 1963 he was nominated as director of the section of ethnic music of Kol Yisrael.

Bibliography 
 Yitzhak Levy Cante Judeo-Español. (Yitzhak Levy Sings, Judeo-Spanish) Association Vidas Largas, Paris 1980
 Chants judéo-espagnols. (Judeo-Spanish Songs) vol. I, London, World Sephardi Federation, [1959]; vols. II, Jerusalem, author, 1970; vol. III, Jerusalem, author, 1971; vol. IV, Jerusalem, author, 1973. Ver
 Antología de Liturgia Judeo-Española. (Anthology of Judeo-Spanish Liturgy)  vols. I-VIII, Jerusalem, author-Ministry of Education and Culture, s.a.; vol. IX, id., 1977; vol. X, written by Moshe Giora Elimelekh, Jerusalem, Institute of Studies of Judeo-Spanish Songs, 1980

References

External links

 The National Library of Israel. Bibliographie zu Yitzhak Isaac Levy
 The Second Half-Century of Sephardic Recordings.
 Las Notas de Matilda – Kantadores de la tradisión djudeo-espanyola: Kohava Levy enero 11th, 2011
 BIBLIOGRAFÍA SEFARDÍ COMENTADA, criterios seguidos. Sefardiweb

1919 births
1977 deaths
Israeli Sephardi Jews
Israeli people of Turkish-Jewish descent
Jewish singers
Judaeo-Spanish-language singers
People from Jerusalem
20th-century Israeli male singers
Turkish emigrants to Mandatory Palestine